The Singles 86>98 is a greatest hits album by English electronic music band Depeche Mode, released on 28 September 1998 by Mute Records. It serves as a follow-up to the band's previous compilation, The Singles 81→85, which was also reissued in the same year. The compilation covers the band's seven-inch single releases spanning five studio albums (from 1986's Black Celebration to 1997's Ultra), while including the new song "Only When I Lose Myself". It also includes "Little 15" (from Music for the Masses, released as a single in Europe) and the live version of "Everything Counts" (from the live album 101), which was released as a single in 1989. All tracks on The Singles 86>98 were newly remastered, as was the case with the re-release of The Singles 81→85.

The band decided to release the album as a close follow-up to Ultra, Depeche Mode's first studio album after Alan Wilder's departure and Dave Gahan's drug addiction and resulting health problems, to maintain interest in the band. The four-month The Singles Tour that followed marked the first time Depeche Mode had toured since the 1993–1994 Devotional/Exotic Tour, since they had declined to tour Ultra a year earlier, playing only a few songs at a handful of shows instead.

The Singles 86>98 has sold 500,000 units in the United States (double albums count as two units), achieving platinum certification. The album was also listed on Blender magazine's "500 CDs You Must Own: Alternative Rock" list.

The Videos 86>98

To coincide with the release of The Singles 86>98, the band released a VHS/DVD called The Videos 86>98 featuring the music videos for all of the songs, and more. In 2002, the DVD was re-released as Videos 86-98+, which included more videos and some electronic press kits.

Track listing

Personnel
Credits adapted from the liner notes of The Singles 86>98.

Depeche Mode
 Alan Wilder
 David Gahan – lead vocals 
 Martin Gore – lead vocals 
 Andy Fletcher

Technical

 Depeche Mode – production ; mixing 
 Daniel Miller – production 
 Gareth Jones – production 
 Phil Harding – remix 
 Dave Bascombe – production 
 Shep Pettibone – remix 
 Flood – production 
 François Kevorkian – mixing 
 Phil Legg – mixing 
 Mark Stent – mixing 
 Alan Wilder – additional production, remix 
 Steve Lyon – additional production, remix 
 Butch Vig – additional production, remix 
 Tim Simenon – production ; mixing 
 Q – mixing 
 Alan Moulder – remix 
 Mike Marsh – compiling, remastering
 Roland Brown – compiling, remastering

Artwork
 Mat Cook – concept, art direction
 Rick Guest – sleeve photography
 Elaine Macintosh – stills production
 Lee Collins – photo shoot technician
 P.A. Taylor – photo shoot technician
 Anton Corbijn – Depeche Mode 86 photograph (taken from "A Question of Time" video)
 Marina Chavez – Depeche Mode 98 photograph

Charts

Weekly charts

Year-end charts

Certifications

References

External links
 Album information from the official Depeche Mode website

1998 greatest hits albums
Albums produced by Butch Vig
Albums produced by Daniel Miller (music producer)
Albums produced by Flood (producer)
Albums produced by Gareth Jones (music producer)
Albums produced by Tim Simenon
Depeche Mode compilation albums
Mute Records compilation albums